Sing and Be Happy is a series of animated sing-along films produced by Universal Pictures. The first film in the series was released in 1946.

Harold James Moore was a director of the films. He also directed The Singing Narners and the 17-minute documentary Harnessed Lightning about a Kentucky horse farm.

Sing and Be Happy featured Jane Pickens.

Leonard Anderson was an editor for the films. He also produced films featuring African American performers.

Filmography
Sing and Be Happy (1946)
Merrily We Sing (1946)
A Bit of Blarney (1946) by Harold James Moore
The Singing Barbers (1946)
Let's Sing A College Song (1947) featuring The Gordonaires
Kernels of Corn (1947)
Let's Go Latin (1947
Let's Sing A Western Song (1947)
Manhattan Memories (1948) featuring Stan Freeman, Art Miller, Ben Mortell, and  Leon Pettingrew
River Melodies (1948)
Choo Choo Swing (1948)
Clap Your Hands (1948)
Hits of The Nineties (1948)
Lamp Post Favorites (1948)
Let's Sing A Love Song (1948)
Minstrel Mania (1948)
Sailing with a Song (1948)
Sing While You Work (1948)
Singin' The Blues (1948)
Singing Along (1948)
Songs of Romance (1948)
Songs of The Seasons (1948)
Spotlight Serenade (1948)
The Year Around (1948)
Moonlight Melodies (1950)
My Favorite Girl (1950)
Dream Dust (1950)
Songs of the Range (1950)

References

Animated film series